Lawrence E. Simmons (July 5, 1911 – October 9, 1994) was an American football and baseball coach.  He served as the head football coach at Tennessee A&I State College—now known as Tennessee State University—in Nashville, Tennessee in 1939 and again from 1961 to 1962, and at the Colored Normal Industrial Agricultural and Mechanical College of South Carolina—now known as South Carolina State University—in Orangeburg, South Carolina from 1951 to 1952, compiling a career college football coach record of 20–18–3.  Simmons also had two stints as the head baseball coach at Tennessee A&I, from 1947 to 1950 and 1953 to 1955.

Simmons was the head football coach at East St. Louis Lincoln High School in East St. Louis, Illinois from 1955 to 1960, tallying a mark of 43–14.

Simmons and his wife Mildred celebrated their 25th wedding anniversary in 1968. He and his wife are interred alongside each other at Jefferson Barracks National Cemetery in Missouri.

Head coaching record

College football

References

External links
 

1911 births
1994 deaths
American football fullbacks
South Carolina State Bulldogs football coaches
Tennessee State Tigers baseball coaches
Tennessee State Tigers football coaches
Tennessee State Tigers football players
High school football coaches in Illinois
African-American coaches of American football
African-American players of American football
African-American baseball coaches
20th-century African-American sportspeople